Dan Healy may refer to:

Dan Healy (detective) (c. 1895–1980), Chicago detective, famous for killing the leader of the North Side Gang, Vincent Drucci
Dan Healy (soundman), audio engineer for The Grateful Dead
Dan Healy (actor) (né Daniel Joseph Healy; 1888–1969), New York actor and theater MC, 3rd husband of Helen Kane
Daniel Healy (born 1974), Australian rules footballer
Daniel Healy (actor), Scottish actor